Harrison "Harry" Fearnley (27 May 1923 – 6 January 2012) was an English professional footballer. He was born in Dewsbury. A goalkeeper, he began his career with Leeds United in 1946 before joining Halifax Town in 1948. In 1949 he joined Newport County and went on to make 103 appearances for the club. In 1953 he joined Selby Town, then appeared once for Rochdale in 1956 before moving to Winsford United.

References

External links
Harrison Fearnley's obituary

1923 births
2012 deaths
People from Dewsbury
English footballers
Association football goalkeepers
Bradford (Park Avenue) A.F.C. players
Leeds United F.C. players
Halifax Town A.F.C. players
Newport County A.F.C. players
Selby Town F.C. players
Rochdale A.F.C. players
Winsford United F.C. players
English Football League players